The 1955 doubled die cent is a die variety that occurred during production of the one cent coin at the United States Mint in 1955.

Origins
When a modern coin die is created, it is struck from a working hub, which places the incuse image onto the die that will subsequently be used to strike coins. Normally, this requires multiple blows. In 1955, one of the working obverse dies at the Philadelphia Mint was misaligned on the second blow from the working hub, thus resulting in a doubled image. Due to the manner in which this hubbing was carried out, it most noticeably affected the date and inscriptions, with very little doubling (albeit noticeable loss of detail) visible on the bust of Lincoln. These doubled features were visible on all of the coins struck from this die.  It is estimated that 40,000 of these coins were minted, all during one night shift at the Philadelphia Mint. Roughly 20,000–24,000 of the pennies were introduced into circulation after the minting error.

The 1955 doubled die is one of the most famous die varieties in US coinage. Very few exist today in totally mint condition, as almost all were discovered while in circulation.  Over the years, many counterfeits of this coin have surfaced.  It is advised for collectors to seek expert opinion before purchasing one of these coins if it has not been certified by one of the top numismatic certification companies.

A seemingly similar variety to the 1955 doubled die is the so-called 1955 "Poor Man's Doubled Die" cent, created by die deterioration doubling.  It is caused when the design on a worn die becomes eroded and distorted, causing part of the design (such as the final digit of the date) to appear doubled. It is much more common than the actual doubled die, and as such it sells for only a few dollars.

In popular culture 
A "1955 doubled die Denver mint penny" is a plot device in the American movie UHF; when  R. J. Fletcher cruelly gives a penny to a beggar, the beggar realizes its value and uses the money earned from trading it in to save a local TV station that Fletcher was hoping to buy out. Although the Denver mint did produce some doubled die pennies in 1955, the doubling is not nearly as noticeable as the more famous Pennsylvania variety.

The coin is mentioned in the 2010 Stephen King novella A Good Marriage.

See also

Doubled die
Coin collecting
Numismatics

Notes and references

Currencies introduced in 1955
One-cent coins of the United States
Mint-made errors